"" ("Arise, Congolese") is the national anthem of the Democratic Republic of the Congo. It was originally adopted in 1960 upon independence from Belgium but was replaced by "La Zaïroise" when the Congo changed its name to Zaire in 1971. It was finally reinstated when the Congo was reorganised in 1997. The lyrics were written by historian and professor Joseph Lutumba, and the music was composed by Jesuit father , who also wrote and composed "La Zaïroise".

References

External links 
 Democratic Republic of the Congo: "Debout Congolais" - Audio of the national anthem of the Democratic Republic of the Congo, with information and lyrics

Democratic Republic of the Congo music
African anthems
National symbols of the Democratic Republic of the Congo
National anthem compositions in C major